Mount Morris College was a religious college affiliated with the Church of the Brethren in Mount Morris, Illinois, USA. The original institution at this location was Rock River Seminary, which was founded by the Methodist Church in 1839. The Methodists closed Rock River Seminary in 1878 and subsequently sold the seminary grounds and buildings to the Church of the Brethren. The Brethren reorganized the school and reopened it in 1879 as Mount Morris Seminary and Collegiate Institute. It officially became Mount Morris College in 1884.

Although the college initially attracted enough students to be successful, luck was never with it. A fire on the campus in January 1912 burned one of the college's main buildings to the ground. Diligent fundraising allowed the campus to continue, and a new building was constructed to replace what was lost. However, by the end of World War I, enrollments began to decline, and financial problems continued to plague the college. Enrollments began to rise again in 1929–1930, but another fire in April 1932 destroyed a dormitory and heavily damaged some classroom and administrative buildings. The financial strain of this second fire, coming during the worst years of the Great Depression was too much. At the end of the school year, in May 1932, Mount Morris College closed forever.

Mount Morris College was a member of the Illinois Intercollegiate Athletic Conference from 1922 to 1931.

Notable alumni
Notable alumni of Mount Morris College include:
Adaline Hohf Beery (1859–1929), American author, newspaper editor, songbook compiler, hymnwriter
Aaron Brumbaugh, sixth president of Shimer College and a leading figure in the Hutchins Great Books movement
Florence King, the first female patent attorney in America
Emery Myers Emmert (1900–1962), Class of 1923. Professor of Horticulture at University of Kentucky 1928–1962, inventor of the plastic greenhouse.
Henry Clay Newcomer, Brigadier General, 1861–1952, Assistant Director of Chemical Warfare Section 1918–1919.

Notable alumni from the Methodist Rock River Seminary include:
W.H.L. Wallace, Civil War Brigadier General, Hero of the Battle of Shiloh
Smith D. Atkins, author, editor, and Civil War commander
John Lourie Beveridge, Governor of Illinois
Shelby Moore Cullom, United States Senator
Charles Henry Fowler, Bishop of the Methodist Episcopal Church
S. M. I. Henry (1839–1900), evangelist, temperance reformer, poet, author
James B. Herrick, physician and first describer of sickle-cell disease
Robert R. Hitt, US Congressman
Daniel Harris Johnson, Wisconsin State Assemblyman

References

Mount Morris College history
Mount Morris - Manchester College
Mount Morris IL dates in history

Universities and colleges affiliated with the Church of the Brethren
Defunct private universities and colleges in Illinois
Educational institutions established in 1879
Burned buildings and structures in the United States
Mount Morris, Illinois
Educational institutions disestablished in 1932
1879 establishments in Illinois
1932 disestablishments in Illinois
Education in Ogle County, Illinois